Elsmere may refer to a place in the United States:

 Elsmere, Delaware
 Elsmere, Kentucky
 Elsmere, Nebraska
 Elsmere, New York

See also
 
 Ellesmere (disambiguation)
 Elsmore (disambiguation)